37 Tauri is a single, orange-hued star in the zodiac constellation of Taurus. It can be seen with the naked eye, having an apparent visual magnitude of 4.36. It is moving further from the Sun with a heliocentric radial velocity of 9.5 km/s.

This is an evolved K-type giant star with a stellar classification of K0 III-IIIb. At the age of 1.39 billion years, it has become a red clump giant, indicating that it is generating energy through helium fusion at its core. The star has around double the mass of the Sun and has expanded to 10 times the Sun's radius. It is radiating roughly 60 times the Sun's luminosity from its enlarged photosphere at an effective temperature of 4,732 K.

Chinese astronomy
In Chinese astronomy, 37 Tauri is called 月, Pinyin: Yuè, meaning Moon, because this star is marking itself and stand alone in Moon asterism, Hairy Head mansion (see : Chinese constellation).

References

K-type giants
Horizontal-branch stars
Taurus (constellation)
Tauri, A1
Durchmusterung objects
Tauri, 037
025604
019038
1256